Yves Jarvis is the stage name of Jean-Sébastien Yves Audet, a Canadian experimental musician, singer and producer who also previously released music under the stage names Un Blonde and Faux Fur.

Biography 
Originally from Calgary, Alberta, Audet was a member of various projects in his teens including Faux Fur, which released a self-titled debut in 2013. His first solo album as Un Blonde, Tenet, was released in 2014. He followed up in 2016 with Good Will Come to You, which was a longlisted nominee for the 2016 Polaris Music Prize. The album was reissued in 2017 on Flemish Eye.

Audet announced in 2018 that he was changing his stage name from Un Blonde to Yves Jarvis, and released his third album The Same but by Different Means in early 2019 on Flemish Eye in Canada and ANTI- in the rest of the world. The album was longlisted for the 2019 Polaris Music Prize.

His 2020 album, Sundry Rock Song Stock, was released to critical acclaim. The album was longlisted for the 2021 Polaris Music Prize.

Name 
Audet changed the project name from Un Blonde to Yves Jarvis in 2018, explaining "Yves is my middle name and Jarvis is my mother's maiden name"

Discography

Albums 

 Good Will Come to You (2016)
 The Same but by Different Means (2019)
 Sundry Rock Song Stock (2020)
 The Zug (2022)

As Un Blonde 

 Tenet (2014)

As Lightman Jarvis Ecstatic Band (with Romy Lightman)
 Banned (2021)

References

21st-century Black Canadian male singers
Canadian indie pop musicians
Canadian indie rock musicians
Canadian experimental musicians
Canadian rock singers
Musicians from Calgary
Living people
Franco-Albertan people
1996 births